Joella may refer to:

 Joella Productions
 726 Joëlla